Oblitoneura is a genus of parasitic flies in the family Tachinidae. There are at least two described species in Oblitoneura.

Species
These two species belong to the genus Oblitoneura:
 Oblitoneura agromyzina Mesnil, 1975
 Oblitoneura aromyzina Mesnil, 1975

References

Further reading

 
 
 
 

Tachinidae
Articles created by Qbugbot